DYTC (94.3 FM), broadcasting as MOR 94.3 For Life!, was a radio station owned and operated by ABS-CBN Corporation. Its studio is located at the ABS-CBN Broadcasting Center, 5th Floor, Uytingkoc Bldg., Avenida Veteranos St., Tacloban. The frequency is currently used by Ormoc-based Radyo Kidlat.

History
The station was inaugurated in 1997 as ABS-CBN Radio under the callsign DYAB-FM, followed by launching of DYAB-TV. A year later, it was renamed as Prostar, along with selected regional stations. In 2001, all of ABS-CBN and Prostar radio stations renamed as MOR (My Only Radio) on the new callsign DYTC. It become No. 1 in Tacloban due to its positive feedback and comments.

Amid the Typhoon Haiyan (Yolanda) last November 8, 2013, the station simulcasted the radio programs of DZMM Radyo Patrol 630 via satellite from Manila to provide news updates and public service for the survivors of the calamity since many homes in Leyte have no electricity brought about by the typhoon. Since then, it aired a simulcast of TV Patrol Eastern Visayas.

On May 5, 2020, the station, along with the other My Only Radio stations, went off the air due to the cease and desist order of the National Telecommunications Commission following the ABS-CBN franchise renewal controversy.

References

External links

Radio stations in Tacloban
Radio stations established in 1997
MOR Philippines stations
OPM formatted radio stations in the Philippines
Radio stations disestablished in 2020
Defunct radio stations in the Philippines